The John J. and Lenora Bartlett House is a historic house in Kearney, Nebraska. It was built in 1888 for John Bartlett, the president of the Kearney National Bank, and designed in the Queen Anne architectural style. It was owned by Edward Webster from 1903 to 1919, when it was purchased by John Barlett's wife, Lenora. It has been listed on the National Register of Historic Places since December 27, 2007.

References

		
National Register of Historic Places in Buffalo County, Nebraska
Queen Anne architecture in Nebraska
Houses completed in 1888